Rabdophaga nielsenii is a gall midge. It was first described by Jean-Jacques Kieffer in 1906. The larvae tunnel in the shoots of bay willow (Salix pentandra) and may cause the shoots to swell slightly.

Description
The orange or red larvae live under the bark of shoots of bay willow (Salix pentandra). Before the larvae pupate they make emergence holes which may be the only indication of their presence.

References

nielsenii
Nematoceran flies of Europe
Gall-inducing insects
Insects described in 1906
Taxa named by Jean-Jacques Kieffer
Willow galls